

From 7,000 to 7,999 

 
 
 
 
 
 
 
 
 
 
 
 
 
 
 
 
 
 
 
 
 
 
 
 
 
 
 
 
 
 
 
 
 
 
 
 
 
 
 
 
 
 
 
 
 
 
 
 
 
 
 
 
 
 
 
 7066 Nessus
 
 
 
 
 
 
 
 
 
 
 
 
 
 
 7088 Ishtar
 
 7092 Cadmus
 
 
 
 
 
 
 
 
 
 
 
 
 
 
 
 
 
 
 
 
 
 
 
 
 
 7119 Hiera
 
 
 
 
 
 
 
 
 
 
 
 
 
 
 
 
 
 
 
 
 
 
 
 
 
 
 
 7152 Euneus
 
 
 
 
 
 
 
 
 
 
 
 
 7166 Kennedy
 7167 Laupheim
 
 
 
 
 
 
 
 
 
 
 
 
 
 7187 Isobe
 
 
 
 
 
 
 
 
 
 
 
 
 
 7204 Ondřejov
 
 
 
 
 
 
 
 
 
 
 
 
 
 
 
 
 
 
 
 
 7225 Huntress
 
 
 
 
 
 
 
 
 
 
 
 
 
 
 
 
 
 
 
 
 
 
 
 
 
 
 
 
 
 
 
 
 
 
 
 
 
 
 
 
 
 
 
 
 
 
 
 
 
 
 
 
 
 
 
 
 
 
 
 
 
 
 
 
 
 
 
 
 
 
 
 
 7317 Cabot
 
 
 
 
 
 
 
 
 
 
 
 
 
 
 
 
 7336 Saunders
 
 
 
 
 7346 Boulanger
 
 
 7352 Hypsenor
 
 
 
 
 
 
 
 
 
 
 
 
 
 
 
 7369 Gavrilin
 
 
 
 
 
 
 
 
 
 
 
 7385 Aktsynovia
 
 7387 Malbil
 
 
 
 
 
 
 
 
 
 
 
 
 
 
 
 
 
 
 
 
 
 
 
 
 
 
 
 
 
 
 
 
 
 
 
 7440 Závist
 
 
 
 
 
 
 
 7449 Döllen
 
 
 
 
 
 
 
 
 
 
 
 
 
 
 
 
 
 
 
 
 7476 Ogilsbie
 
 
 
 
 
 
 
 
 
 
 
 
 
 
 
 
 
 
 
 
 
 
 
 
 7505 Furusho
 
 
 
 
 
 
 
 
 7517 Alisondoane
 
 
 7526 Ohtsuka
 
 
 7529 Vagnozzi
 
 
 
 
 
 
 
 
 
 7543 Prylis
 
 7545 Smaklösa
 
 
 7548 Engström
 
 
 
 
 7553 Buie
 
 
 
 
 
 
 
 
 
 
 
 
 
 
 
 
 
 
 
 
 
 
 
 
 
 
 
 
 
 
 
 
 7604 Kridsadaporn
 
 
 
 
 
 
 
 
 
 
 
 
 
 
 
 
 
 
 
 
 
 
 
 
 
 
 7638 Gladman
 
 
 7641 Cteatus
 
 
 
 7648 Tomboles
 
 
 
 7655 Adamries
 
 
 
 
 
 
 
 
 
 
 
 
 
 
 7675 Gorizia
 
 
 
 
 
 
 
 
 
 7687 Matthias
 
 
 
 
 
 
 
 
 
 
 
 
 
 
 
 
 
 
 
 
 
 
 
 
 
 
 
 
 
 
 
 
 
 
 
 
 
 
 
 
 
 
 
 
 
 
 
 7742 Altamira
 
 
 
 
 
 
 
 
 
 
 
 
 
 
 
 
 
 7776 Takeishi
 
 
 
 
 
 
 7784 Watterson
 
 
 
 
 
 7794 Sanvito
 7796 Járacimrman
 
 
 
 
 
 7803 Adachi
 
 
 
 
 
 
 
 
 
 
 7816 Hanoi
 
 
 
 
 
 
 
 
 
 
 7835 Myroncope
 
 
 
 
 
 
 7846 Setvák
 
 
 
 
 
 
 
 
 
 
 
 
 
 
 
 
 
 
 
 7866 Sicoli
 
 
 
 
 
 
 
 
 
 
 
 
 
 
 
 
 
 
 
 
 
 
 
 
 
 
 
 
 
 
 
 
 
 
 
 
 
 
 
 
 
 
 
 
 
 
 
 
 
 
 
 
 
 
 
 
 
 
 
 
 
 7958 Leakey
 7959 Alysecherri
 
 
 
 
 
 
 7968 Elst-Pizarro

See also 
 List of minor planet discoverers
 List of observatory codes

References

External links 
 Discovery Circumstances: Numbered Minor Planets, Minor Planet Center

Lists of minor planets by name